Netball at the 2019 Arafura Games was played at the Territory Netball Stadium between 1–4 May 2019. Fiji were the winners.

Results

Table Pool A

Table Pool B

Pool games & playoff games

Semi-finals

Bronze-medal match

Gold-medal match

Final standings

See also
 Netball at the Arafura Games

External links

2019
2019 in Australian netball
2001 in netball
May 2019 sports events in Australia